Vatika may refer to
Ashok Vatika, a garden in Lanka in Hindu mythology
Hanuman Vatika, a garden in Rourkela, India
Shatavar Vatika Herbal Park, Hisar in India
Shyam Vatika, a mural in Gwalior, India
Vatika High School for Deaf & Dumb in Chandigarh, India
Rajdhani Vatika, an alternative name for Eco Park, Patna in Bihar, India
Vatika, an alternative name for Voies, a former municipality in Greece
Vatika Business Centre, a Serviced Office Spaces provider in India